In enzymology, a phenylacetate—CoA ligase is an enzyme that catalyzes the chemical reaction

ATP + phenylacetate + CoA  AMP + diphosphate + phenylacetyl-CoA

The 3 substrates of this enzyme are ATP, phenylacetate, and CoA. Its 3 products are AMP, diphosphate, and phenylacetyl-CoA.

This enzyme belongs to the family of ligases, specifically those forming carbon-sulfur bonds as acid-thiol ligases.  The systematic name of this enzyme class is phenylacetate:CoA ligase (AMP-forming). Other names in common use include phenylacetyl-CoA ligase, PA-CoA ligase, and phenylacetyl-CoA ligase (AMP-forming).  This enzyme participates in tyrosine metabolism and phenylalanine metabolism.

References

 

EC 6.2.1
Enzymes of unknown structure